Namgay Tshering is a Bhutanese politician who has been Minister for Finance since November 2018. He has been a member of the National Assembly of Bhutan, since October 2018.

Early life and education
Tshering was born .

He received a degree of Bachelor of Science in Communication from the University of Madras, India, and a Master's degree in Public Health from Chulalongkorn University, Thailand.

Professional career
Before entering politics, he served as the project coordinator (World Bank and Global Fund Project), planning officer at Ministry of Health, program manager at National HIV/AIDS control program, (2014-2018) and National professional officer at World Health Organization, (2014-2016).

Political career
Tshering is a member of Druk Nyamrup Tshogpa (DNT). He was elected to the National Assembly of Bhutan in the 2018 elections for the Dokar-Sharpa constituency. He received 4,155 votes and defeated Chencho Dorji, a candidate of Druk Phuensum Tshogpa.

On 3 November, Lotay Tshering formally announced his cabinet structure, and Namgay Tshering was named as the Minister for Finance. On 7 November 2018, he was sworn in as Minister for Finance in the cabinet of Prime Minister Lotay Tshering.

References 

Living people
Finance ministers of Bhutan
Bhutanese politicians
1979 births
University of Madras alumni
Namgay Tshering
Bhutanese MNAs 2018–2023
Lotay Tshering ministry
Druk Nyamrup Tshogpa politicians
Druk Nyamrup Tshogpa MNAs